Down These Mean Streets is a mass market paperback, authored by Keith R. A. DeCandido and starring Spider-Man. It is one of several paperbacks in the Marvel Comics line published by Pocket Star Books. If regarded in Earth-616 canon, the events in the novel take place roughly after Amazing Spider-Man #509.

Plot introduction 
The story centers around a mysterious drug known as Triple X that has been giving its users superpowers as well as rendering them mentally and physically unstable. Spider-Man is forced to team with the police to not only protect people from the enhanced users but find the origin of the drug itself. They soon learn that one of Spider-Man's most prominent enemies might be behind the drug but for a grander scheme.

Reception 
The book received good reviews from Unreality-sf.net and Spiderfan.org.

See also 
 Spider-Man in literature
 Nick Fury, Agent of S.H.I.E.L.D.: Empyre, another novel based on a Marvel comics character

References 

2005 American novels
Marvel Comics novels
Spider-Man novels
Pocket Books books